The Dictionary of National Biography (DNB) is a standard work of reference on notable figures from British history, published since 1885. The updated Oxford Dictionary of National Biography (ODNB) was published on 23 September 2004 in 60 volumes and online, with 50,113 biographical articles covering 54,922 lives.

First series
Hoping to emulate national biographical collections published elsewhere in Europe, such as the Allgemeine Deutsche Biographie (1875), in 1882 the publisher George Smith (1824–1901), of Smith, Elder & Co., planned a universal dictionary that would include biographical entries on individuals from world history. He approached Leslie Stephen, then editor of the Cornhill Magazine, owned by Smith, to become the editor. Stephen persuaded Smith that the work should focus only on subjects from the United Kingdom and its present and former colonies. An early working title was the Biographia Britannica, the name of an earlier eighteenth-century reference work.

The first volume of the Dictionary of National Biography appeared on 1 January 1885. In May 1891 Leslie Stephen resigned and Sidney Lee, Stephen's assistant editor from the beginning of the project, succeeded him as editor. A dedicated team of sub-editors and researchers worked under Stephen and Lee, combining a variety of talents from veteran journalists to young scholars who cut their academic teeth on dictionary articles at a time when postgraduate historical research in British universities was still in its infancy. While much of the dictionary was written in-house, the DNB also relied on external contributors, who included several respected writers and scholars of the late nineteenth century. By 1900, more than 700 individuals had contributed to the work. Successive volumes appeared quarterly with complete punctuality until midsummer 1900, when the series closed with volume 63. The year of publication, the editor and the range of names in each volume is given below.

Supplements and revisions

Since the scope included only deceased figures, the DNB was soon extended by the issue of three supplementary volumes, covering subjects who had died between 1885 and 1900 or who had been overlooked in the original alphabetical sequence. The supplements brought the whole work up to the death of Queen Victoria on 22 January 1901. Corrections were added.

After issuing a volume of errata in 1904, the dictionary was reissued with minor revisions in 22 volumes in 1908 and 1909; a subtitle said that it covered British history "from the earliest times to the year 1900". In the words of the Encyclopædia Britannica Eleventh Edition, the dictionary had "proved of inestimable service in elucidating the private annals of the British", providing not only concise lives of the notable deceased, but additionally lists of sources which were invaluable to researchers in a period when few libraries or collections of manuscripts had published catalogues or indices, and the production of indices to periodical literatures was just beginning. Throughout the twentieth century, further volumes were published for those who had died, generally on a decade-by-decade basis, beginning in 1912 with a supplement edited by Lee covering those who died between 1901 and 1911. The dictionary was transferred from its original publishers, Smith, Elder & Co., to Oxford University Press in 1917. Until 1996, Oxford University Press continued to add further supplements featuring articles on subjects who had died during the twentieth century. These include the 3rd supplement in 1927 (covering those who died between 1912 and 1921), 4th supplement in 1937 (covering those who died between 1922 and 1930), 5th supplement in 1949 (covering those who died between 1931 and 1940), 6th supplement in 1959 (covering those who died between 1941 and 1950), 7th supplement in 1971 (covering those who died between 1951 and 1960), 8th supplement in 1981 (covering those who died between 1961 and 1970), 9th supplement in 1986 (covering those who died between 1971 and 1980), 10th supplement in 1990 (covering those who died between 1981 and 1985), 11th supplement in 1993 (covering missing persons, see below), and 12th supplement in 1996 (covering those who died between 1986 and 1990).

The 63 volumes of the original DNB included 29,120 lives; the supplements published between 1912 and 1996 added about 6,000 lives of people who died in the twentieth century. In 1993 a volume containing missing biographies was published. This had an additional 1,086 lives, selected from over 100,000 suggestions.

L. G. L. Legg was editor of the DNB in the 1940s.

In 1966, the University of London published a volume of corrections, cumulated from the Bulletin of the Institute of Historical Research.

Concise dictionary
There were various versions of the Concise Dictionary of National Biography, which covered everyone in the main work but with much shorter articles; some were only two lines.  The last edition, in three volumes, covered everyone who died before 1986.

Oxford Dictionary of National Biography

In the early 1990s Oxford University Press committed itself to overhauling the DNB. Work on what was known until 2001 as the New Dictionary of National Biography, or New DNB, began in 1992 under the editorship of Colin Matthew, professor of Modern History at the University of Oxford. Matthew decided that no subjects from the old dictionary would be excluded, however insignificant the subjects appeared to a late twentieth-century eye; that a minority of shorter articles from the original dictionary would remain in the new version in revised form, but most would be rewritten; and that room would be made for about 14,000 new subjects. Suggestions for new subjects were solicited through questionnaires placed in libraries and universities and, as the 1990s advanced, online. The suggestions were assessed by the editor, the 12 external consultant editors, and several hundred associate editors and in-house staff.  Digitisation of the DNB was performed by the Alliance Photosetting Company in Pondicherry, India.

The new dictionary would cover British history, "broadly defined" (including, for example, subjects from Roman Britain, the United States of America before its independence, and from Britain's former colonies, provided they were functionally part of the Empire and not of "the indigenous culture", as stated in the Introduction), up to 31 December 2000. The research project was conceived as a collaborative one, with in-house staff co-ordinating the work of nearly 10,000 contributors internationally. It would remain selective – there would be no attempt to include all members of parliament, for example – but would seek to include significant, influential or notorious figures from the whole canvas of the life of Britain and its former colonies, overlaying the decisions of the late-nineteenth-century editors with the interests of late-twentieth-century scholarship in the hope that "the two epochs in collaboration might produce something more useful for the future than either epoch on its own", but acknowledging also that a final definitive selection is impossible to achieve.

Matthews's dedication to a digitised ODNB included what Christopher Warren calls Matthews's "data internationalism". In a 1996 essay, Matthew prophesied, "Who can doubt that in the course of the next century, as nationality in Europe gives way to European Union, so national reference works, at least in Europe, will do so also....Just as the computer is collapsing national library catalogues in a single world-wide series, so I am sure that in the course of the next fifty years we will see the gradual aggregation of our various dictionaries of national biography. We will be much blamed by our users if we do not!"

Following Matthew's death in October 1999, he was succeeded as editor by another Oxford historian, Professor Brian Harrison, in January 2000.  The new dictionary, now known as the Oxford Dictionary of National Biography (or ODNB), was published on 23 September 2004 in 60 volumes in print at a price of £7500, and in an online edition for subscribers. Most UK holders of a current library card can access it online free of charge. In subsequent years, the print edition has been able to be obtained new for a much lower price. At publication, the 2004 edition had 50,113 biographical articles covering 54,922 lives, including entries on all subjects included in the old DNB. (The old DNB entries on these subjects may be accessed separately through a link to the "DNB Archive" – many of the longer entries are still highly regarded.) A small permanent staff remain in Oxford to update and extend the coverage of the online edition. Harrison was succeeded as editor by another Oxford historian, Dr Lawrence Goldman, in October 2004. The first online update was published on 4 January 2005, including subjects who had died in 2001. A further update, including subjects from all periods, followed on 23 May 2005, and another on 6 October 2005. New subjects who died in 2002 were added to the online dictionary on 5 January 2006, with continuing releases in May and October in subsequent years following the precedent of 2005. The ODNB also includes some new biographies on people who died before the DNB was published and are not included in the original DNB, because they have become notable since the DNB was published through the work of more recent historians, for example William Eyre (fl. 1634–1675).

The online version has an advanced search facility, allowing a search for people by area of interest, religion and "Places, Dates, Life Events". This accesses an electronic index that cannot be directly viewed.

Response to the new dictionary has been for the most part positive, but in the months following publication there was occasional criticism of the dictionary in some British newspapers and periodicals for reported factual inaccuracies. However, the number of articles publicly queried in this way was small – only 23 of the 50,113 articles published in September 2004, leading to fewer than 100 substantiated factual amendments. These and other queries received since publication are being considered as part of an ongoing programme of assessing proposed corrections or additions to existing subject articles, which can, when approved, be incorporated into the online edition of the dictionary.  In 2005, The American Library Association awarded the Oxford Dictionary of National Biography its prestigious Dartmouth Medal. A general review of the dictionary was published in 2007.

Sir David Cannadine took over the editorship from October 2014.

First series contents

See also
 List of contributors to the Dictionary of National Biography
 Biographical dictionary
 Oxford Biography Index
 Historiography of the United Kingdom

References

External links

 (subscription required)
About the Oxford DNB, Oxford University Press site
Corrections to the ODNB submitted and peer-reviewed by members of soc.medieval/Gen-Med
DNB
 Index and Epitome to the Dictionary of National Biography, 1903, Perseus Digital Library
"National Biography" in Leslie Stephen's Studies of a Biographer, vol. 1
Online volumes of the first and second series, selected from Internet Archive and Google Books at The Online Books Page.

 
1885 non-fiction books
2004 non-fiction books
British biographers
British non-fiction literature
Online person databases
National Biography
Oxford University Press reference books
British biographical dictionaries
Book series introduced in 1885